Henry Allcock (baptised January 26, 1759 – February 22, 1808) was a judge and political figure in Upper and Lower Canada.

His family was from Edgbaston and he was born in Birmingham, England in 1759 and studied law at Lincoln's Inn in London. He was called to the bar in 1791. In 1798, he was appointed judge in the Court of King's Bench of Upper Canada. In 1800, he was elected to the 3rd Parliament of Upper Canada representing Durham, Simcoe and 1st York.  However, a petition was raised citing irregularities on the part of his agent and he was unseated. Angus Macdonell won the seat in a by-election.

He presided over the trial of John Small for the murder of John White in a duel. Small was set free. In 1802, he became chief justice for Upper Canada succeeding John Elmsley and, in 1803, he was appointed to the Executive Council for the province.

In 1805, he became Chief Justice of Lower Canada and a member of the Executive Council of Lower Canada despite support for another candidate, Jonathan Sewell, by the upper class of the province and the lieutenant governor. He was named speaker for the Legislative Council of Lower Canada in January 1808.

He died of a fever at Quebec City in 1808, while in office.

References 
 
 "ALLCOCK, HENRY," by Frederick H. Armstrong, Dictionary of Canadian Biography, vol. 5, University of Toronto/Université Laval, 2003–

Chief justices of Upper Canada
Chief justices of Lower Canada
Members of the Legislative Council of Upper Canada
Members of the Legislative Council of Lower Canada
English barristers
English emigrants to pre-Confederation Ontario
People from Birmingham, West Midlands
1759 births
1808 deaths
Immigrants to Upper Canada
 infectious disease deaths in Quebec